Daniel Nestor and Sandon Stolle were the defending champions but only Stolle competed that year with Joshua Eagle.

Eagle and Stolle lost in the first round to Martin Damm and Cyril Suk.

David Prinosil and David Rikl won in the final 4–6, 7–6(7–5), 7–5 against Jonas Björkman and Todd Woodbridge.

Seeds
Champion seeds are indicated in bold text while text in italics indicates the round in which those seeds were eliminated.

  Jonas Björkman /  Todd Woodbridge (final)
  Martin Damm /  Cyril Suk (semifinals)
  Jiří Novák /  Radek Štěpánek (first round)
  David Prinosil /  David Rikl (champions)

Draw

External links
 2002 Gerry Weber Open Doubles Draw

2002 Gerry Weber Open